The 1953 Bolivian Primera División, the first division of Bolivian football (soccer), was played by 8 teams. The champion was Bolívar.

Torneo Interdepartamental

Standings

External links
 Official website of the LFPB 

Bolivian Primera División seasons
Bolivia
1953 in Bolivian sport